Karmanovo (Qarman) is a rural locality (a village) in Bul-Kaypanovsky Selsoviet, Tatyshlinsky District, Bashkortostan, Russia. The population was 37 as of 2010. There is 1 street.

Geography 
Karmanovo is located 20 km northwest of Verkhniye Tatyshly (the district's administrative centre) by road. Starokaypanovo is the nearest rural locality.

References 

Rural localities in Tatyshlinsky District